Lester Gene Hatfield (November 23, 1925 – February 18, 2017), known mononymously as Gene, was an artist and professor at the University of Central Arkansas (UCA) in Conway, Arkansas. Hatfield was a recipient of the Arkansas Arts Council Governor's Lifetime Achievement Award, an Arkansas Senate Citation, and a Purple Heart in addition to other various awards for his art and service in World War II.

Hatfield worked primarily in watercolor, oil, acrylic, pottery, stage sets, and various types of sculpture. He was known in Conway for his unique yard filled with sculptures made from various found objects ranging from bicycles, to soda cans, to mops, to tin foil, and more. His famous eclectic outdoor art environment was a result of over forty years of working with unorthodox materials. Hatfield incorporated aspects of surrealism and folk art into his sculpture. His paintings were influenced by more traditional late-nineteenth-century artists such as Paul Cézanne.

With a long tenure as a professor and contributor to UCA, Hatfield was an important part of Arkansas’ art culture.

Early life and education 
Hatfield was born on November 23, 1925, in Conway, Arkansas, to Lester and Gertrude Powers Hatfield. His father was a building contractor. The financial setback of the Great Depression caused the family to move from Conway to Mount Vernon, Arkansas, Lester and Gertrude's hometown. The Hatfield family returned to Conway in 1937. Hatfield graduated from Conway High School in 1942 and enrolled at Arkansas State Teachers College (which later became the University of Central Arkansas) in the fall of 1942. Hatfield was one of the few male students on campus, as he began school during World War II. After three semesters in college, Hatfield was drafted into the U.S. Army in January 1944. Hatfield completed his basic training at Fort Benning, Georgia, and received additional training at Fort Bragg, North Carolina. In September 1944, he was sent to France, where he landed at Marseilles. His unit camped in a field outside Marseilles until they were picked up by Army trucks and taken to the frontlines. While in northern France, Hatfield's unit fought in the Vosges Mountains to the Rhine River. In April 1945, during combat, Hatfield suffered a severe shrapnel injury from an anti-tank grenade, which exploded in a tree near him. The shrapnel caused severe injuries to his face and just missed his left eye. At a field hospital near Stuttgart, Germany, a surgeon removed all the shrapnel. He was then sent to a hospital in Tuscaloosa, Alabama, where he recovered. For his injury Hatfield received the Purple Heart.

For his wartime service he also received the Bronze Star and a Medal of Meritorious Conduct. After he received an honorable discharge from the Army, Hatfield again enrolled in college and in the summer of 1947 he received a Bachelor of Science in Education from Arkansas State Teachers College. He then studied art in graduate school at the University of Northern Colorado in Greely, Colorado, where he earned a Master of Arts degree in art.

Career 
Hatfield's career as a professor of art began at what is now the University of Central Arkansas (UCA) on September 1, 1948. His first year salary was $2,400 annually and Marie Schichtl was the head of the UCA Department of Art. Hatfield continued his education during the summer months, and he took advanced classes in Saint Ives, England, and in Paris, Fontainebleau, and Aix-en-Provence, France. Hatfield had a long career teaching in the UCA Department of Art and after 37 years he retired in 1985. In 1995, the UCA Board of Trustees named Gene Hatfield a Distinguished Professor Emeritus of Art.

In 1957 Hatfield married Nicole Wable in Montreuil Sur-Mer France and the couple had three children, Hadrian, Marc and Mathilda. The Hatfield family had a very long connection to the University of Central Arkansas that began with Hatfield's older sister and continued through his children. Hadrian and Mathilda received degrees from the University of Central Arkansas and Marc also attended college at the University of Central Arkansas and graduated from the University of Arkansas.

After Hatfield retired he maintained a keen interest in the University of Central Arkansas and the many events that took place on campus. He visited the campus frequently and discussed many topics with professors and students, but his passion was always art.

After retirement, Hatfield was most noted by having his yard around his home on Donaghey Avenue filled with sculptures, something that he took great pleasure in creating. In a conversation with this author, Hatfield commented that he knew the angels were directing him when he was painting a portrait or working on a sculpture. Hatfield remained active in art up until just a few months before he passed away. Hatfield died on February 18, 2017, at the age of 91.

References

1925 births
2017 deaths
University of Central Arkansas faculty
United States Army personnel of World War II
University of Northern Colorado alumni